2032 Ethel, provisional designation , is a dark background asteroid from the outer regions of the asteroid belt, approximately 36 kilometers in diameter. It was discovered on 30 July 1970, by Soviet astronomer Tamara Smirnova at the Crimean Astrophysical Observatory in Nauchnyj, on the Crimean peninsula. The asteroid was named after Irish writer Ethel Voynich.

Orbit and classification 

Ethel is a non-family asteroid of the main belt's background population. It orbits the Sun in the outer asteroid belt at a distance of 2.7–3.5 AU once every 5 years and 5 months (1,967 days; semi-major axis 3.07 AU). Its orbit has an eccentricity of 0.13 and an inclination of 2° with respect to the ecliptic.

Physical characteristics

Diameter and albedo 

According to the survey carried out by the NEOWISE mission of NASA's Wide-field Infrared Survey Explorer, Ethel measures 36.007 kilometers in diameter and its surface has an albedo of 0.034.

Rotation period 

As of 2017, no rotational lightcurve of Ethel has been obtained from photometric observations. The body's rotation period, poles and shape remain unknown.

Naming 

This minor planet was named after Ethel Lilian Voynich (1864–1960), an Irish writer of the late Victorian epoch, best known for her novel The Gadfly. The official  was published by the Minor Planet Center on 1 September 1978.

References

External links 
 Asteroid Lightcurve Database (LCDB), query form (info )
 Dictionary of Minor Planet Names, Google books
 Asteroids and comets rotation curves, CdR – Observatoire de Genève, Raoul Behrend
 Discovery Circumstances: Numbered Minor Planets (1)-(5000) – Minor Planet Center
 
 

002032
Discoveries by Tamara Mikhaylovna Smirnova
Named minor planets
19700730